Grazia MacIntosh (née van Hattum) (born 25 April 1955 in New Plymouth) is a former association football goalkeeper who represented New Zealand at international level.

MacIntosh made her full Football Ferns debut in a 1–2 loss to Australia on 4 October 1981.

MacIntosh is the sister of former All Whites goalkeeper Frank van Hattum and fellow women's international Marie-Jose Cooper.

References 

1955 births
Living people
New Zealand women's international footballers
New Zealand women's association footballers
Women's association football goalkeepers
New Zealand people of Dutch descent
Sportspeople from New Plymouth